Ghost Stories is an American paranormal television series that premiered on October 16, 2009 on the Travel Channel. The program is produced by MY Tupelo Entertainment. As its title implies, the series features ghost stories. Each episode showcases stories, legends and tales of different reportedly haunted locations in the United States.

Synopsis
The series is narrated by Jay Thomas, a television and film actor best known for his Emmy-award-winning role as Jerry Gold on Murphy Brown and Eddie LeBec on Cheers. Each episode combines historical footage, re-enactments, and interviews with eyewitnesses and local historians to tell ghost stories from personal experiences, encounters and paranormal activity in an allegedly haunted location. These stories also include cold cases or unsolved murder cases where the victims are claimed to come back as a spirit to haunt the living many years later after their death. Every episode ends with narrator Jay Thomas saying, "Nighty night!"

Syndication
The show currently aired on the Travel Channel Saturday nights at 10pm EST. At the beginning of each episode a parental advisory warning was shown.

Series overview

Episodes

Season 1 (2009)

Season 2 (2010)

See also
 Ghost story
 Ghost hunting
 List of ghost films
 List of reportedly haunted locations
 Paranormal television

Similar TV programs

Ghost Adventures (also produced by MY Tupelo Entertainment)
Ghost Hunters
Ghost Hunters International
Ghost Lab
Ghost Stories (1997–98)
Most Haunted
Most Terrifying Places in America
My Ghost Story
Scariest Places on Earth

References
Ghost Stories episode guide by AOL Television

External links
 by MY Tupelo Entertainment

2009 American television series debuts
2010 American television series endings
Travel Channel original programming
English-language television shows
Paranormal reality television series